Kamel Bouacida (born August 6, 1976) is an Algerian footballer. He has played for the Algeria national team.

National team statistics

References

1976 births
Living people
Algerian footballers
Algeria under-23 international footballers
Association football defenders
Algeria international footballers
21st-century Algerian people